This is a list of the busiest airports in the Netherlands.

Busiest airports by total passenger boardings
The Netherlands' 5 busiest airports by passenger traffic.

2019

2018

2017

2016

2015

2014

2013

2012

2011

References

Ne
Airports in the Netherlands
 Busiest